Oskar Silde (25 August 1900 Käina Parish, Hiiu County – 12 January 1996 Tallinn) was an Estonian politician. He was a member of Estonian National Assembly.

References

1900 births
1996 deaths
Members of the Estonian National Assembly
University of Tartu alumni
Academic staff of the Tallinn University of Technology
People from Hiiumaa Parish